Solid Ground is the sixth studio album by American saxophonist Ronnie Laws released in 1981 by Liberty Records.

The album reached No. 17 on the Billboard Top Soul Albums chart.

Track listing

Charts
Album

Singles

References

1981 albums
Ronnie Laws albums
Liberty Records albums